Miss Afghanistan may refer to:

 Zohra Daoud (born 1954), the first official Miss Afghanistan - Miss Afghanistan 1972
 Vida Samadzai (born 1978), candidate in Miss Earth 2003
 Zallascht Sadat (born 1986), Miss Afghanistan 2009
 Bahari Ibaadat (born 1993), Miss Afghanistan 2014

Beauty pageants in Afghanistan